A Century of Song is a 6-CD box set by La Musique Populaire. As the title suggests, A Century of Song is a chronological overview of songs from the 20th century. Recorded from 1999 to 2003, the songs were originally available for download from their website Eschewing the canonical choices that would define such a chronology, LMP recorded songs ranging from the Tin Pan Alley of the turn of the century, to rap, alternative rock and dance music at the century. As such, A Century of Songs covers a multitude of genres, including plunderphonics, krautrock, happy hardcore and country.

Reviews were generally positive, but some expressed bafflement at the selection of songs and the disparate styles used.

The songs were eventually collected in a six CD-R disc box set, limited to 100 editions worldwide.

Reviews were generally positive, but some expressed bafflement at the selection of songs and the disparate styles used.

Recording 
With the release of their EP Aunt Canada in 1996, LMP had attempted to expand their sound. Band members Ryan Bassler and Eric Haugen felt that, far from making their own Pet Sounds, they compromised their perfectionism with budgetary concerns, technical and personal limitation. Coupled with interpersonal conflicts and a simultaneous non-existent and hostile reception in their native Champaign, Illinois, LMP settled in Evanston, a suburb north of Chicago, in 1999. The move also parsed what was a 22 person pop orchestra to core members Bassler and Haugen. In their new recording space, which they called "Eckhouse 2000", they decided to shelve current projects for a new project.

In a 2005 interview with Italian web magazine Indipop.it, Haugen said that A Century of Song was the band's attempt at "to explore a lot of different avenues of pop music and ultimately discover our own sound." This was inspired from his and Bessler's interest in constructing personas, which they refer to as "fake authenticity", alongside new band names, recording locations, and imaginary personnel." Haugen lists song poem producer Rodd Keith as an inspiration to the project as the breadth, along with limited time, meant that "the aim was simply to make a finished recording as quickly as possible, and then move on to the next."

Originally planned for a six week recording schedule, it ended up taking 18 months. Starting in 1999, LMP posted their progress as MP3s on their official website. After uploading the final song in 2001, they moved to other projects, which included EPs The New Body Language and Meeting Up and Making Friends, and their debut album Love Conquers Alda. Because of fan demand however , LMP decided to release the sessions as a box set.

Composition 
As a chronology of music in the 20th century, LMP selected several songs that exemplified the time period. Songs such as "Will You Love Me Tomorrow" and "She May Call You Up Tonight" were covered in a straightforward fashion, which critic Douglas Wolk calls it covers "done in the style of... LMP themselves." However, the bulk of the album is made up of radical departures from their original forms, with songs of one genre transposed to another. "You'll Never Walk Alone" is composed as a sound collage, inspired by John Oswald, cutting in snippets of songs to form the lyrics. Hits of '69" is a stylistic cover of the Stars on 45, as a pastiche of the form and as a medley of songs of that year. An exception is "C' Howard's Gum Has the Power of Taste, an original song in the style of radio commercials of the fifties.

Release 
When recording on A Century of Song ended in 2002, LMP planned on releasing the set in December of that year. Because of production delays, LMP decided to postpone the release to another date. By November of 2003, the box set was still delayed, but by March 2004, it was moved to April 20 of that year. The reason given was a break from recording and moving to another studio space in Chicago. Eventually A Century of Song was finally released to online orders in November 2004.

Each box set came with six CD-Rs; discs one through five contained the original project, and the sixth bonus materials, including outtakes, remixes, and other unreleased materials. They came with 132 pages of liner notes, both enclosed in hand-made plastic boxes.

Reception 

Critical reception of A Century of Song was positive, applauding LMP for their inventive covers of pop songs. Michaelangelo Matos of The Village Voice said that what LMP "lack in suavity and flair they make up for with sheer doggedness and idea mongering." Douglas Wolk of Seattle Weekly had the same sentiment that, despite the lack of polish, "it sounds like everyone's having a great time." Much of the negative criticism was levied at the nature of the box set's release, with Greg Adams of Allmusic stating that it was disappointing "that more people won't hear it."

Track listing

References 

2004 albums
Covers albums